The Portrait of Giuliano de' Medici is a painting of Giuliano de' Medici (1453-1478) by the Italian Renaissance painter Sandro Botticelli, probably painted soon before Giuliano was assassinated in the Pazzi Conspiracy in 1478. It belongs to the Berlin State Museums, and is in the Gemäldegalerie, Berlin.

It is believed to be the earliest of a number of versions by Botticelli.

1478 paintings
Giuliano
Giuliano de' Medici
Paintings in the Gemäldegalerie, Berlin